Dagne Groven Myhren (born 1940) is a Norwegian literature researcher, folk musician and educator. Her literary studies have included significant works on Henrik Wergeland (earning her a PhD) and on Norwegian folk poetry. As a singer, she has focused on the traditional songs of Telemark, frequently contributing to radio programmes. Until her retirement in 2003, she was professor of Nordic Studies at the University of Oslo.

Early life, family and education
Born on 19 September 1940 in Oslo, Dagne Groven was the daughter of the composer Eivind Olavsson Groven (1901–77) and his wife Ragna Charlotte Joselin née Hagen (1902–60). The third of the family's four children, her elder sister Tone Groven Holmboe was a composer. She was married to the violinist  (1937–2015) with whom she had two children, the folk musician Øyonn Groven Myhren (born 1969) and the philologist Eilev Groven Myhren (born 1973). In addition to folklore, music and Nordic studies, in 1988 she earned a PhD for her thesis on Henrik Wergeland's poetical work: Creation, Man and the Messiah.

Career
Myrhen began lecturing in Nordic literature at the University of Oslo in 1972, becoming a full professor in 1998. She retired from the university in 2003.

Her literary research centred on Wergeland's poem Creation, Man and the Messiah, culminating in her thesis Kjærlighet og logos which was published as a book in 1991. She conducted research on the authors Hans E. Kinck and Tarjei Vesaas and undertook an analysis of Henrik Ibsen's Peer Gynt. She developed her interest in folklore in collaboration with her maternal aunt  Ingeborg Refling Hagen and participated in her Stutting Movement.

Encouraged by her father Eivind Groven and by the folk musicians Talleiv Røysland and Aslak Brekke, Myrhen has developed a special interest in the vocal traditions of Telemark. As a singer, she has been complimented on her stylistic range and the sensitivity of her songs. Since 1964, she has made recordings and has presented folk music radio programmes on NRK. Her compositions include music for the verses of poets including Wergeland, Riefling and Bjørnstjerne Bjørnson.

References

1940 births
Living people
Academic staff of the University of Oslo
Writers from Oslo
Norwegian folk musicians
20th-century Norwegian non-fiction writers
20th-century Norwegian women writers
21st-century Norwegian women writers
Norwegian folklorists